The following is a list of the 19 cantons of the Corrèze department, in France, following the French canton reorganisation which came into effect in March 2015:

 Allassac
 Argentat-sur-Dordogne
 Brive-la-Gaillarde-1
 Brive-la-Gaillarde-2
 Brive-la-Gaillarde-3
 Brive-la-Gaillarde-4
 Égletons
 Haute-Dordogne
 Malemort
 Midi Corrézien
 Naves
 Plateau de Millevaches
 Saint-Pantaléon-de-Larche
 Sainte-Fortunade
 Seilhac-Monédières
 Tulle
 Ussel
 Uzerche
 L'Yssandonnais

References